Wharminda is a locality in the Australian state of South Australia located on the Eyre Peninsula about  west of the state capital of Adelaide.

Its boundaries were created in 1998 in respect to "the long established name" which is reported as being derived from the "native name of a spring and range of hills in the area", with the spring being known as "The Wharminda Soak", and the literal translation of the word "Wharminda" being "weak water".

Wharminda Primary School opened as Wharminda Siding School in 1914. The locality also contains a hall, library and tennis courts.

A postal receiving office opened at Wharminda on 5 January 1914, became a licensed post office on 11 January 1994, and closed on 24 September 1999. It also formerly had a siding on the Eyre Peninsula Railway, which still runs through Wharminda.

The principal land use within the locality is 'primary production' which mainly concerned with "grazing and cropping."   It also includes the protected area known as the Wharminda Conservation Park.

Wharinda is located within the federal division of Grey, the state electoral district of Flinders and the local government area of the District Council of Cleve.

References

Eyre Peninsula
Towns in South Australia